Mordellistena isabellina is a beetle in the genus Mordellistena of the family Mordellidae. It was described in 1891 by George Charles Champion.

References

isabellina
Beetles described in 1891